The Șindrilița is a left tributary of the river Pasărea in Romania. It flows into the Pasărea  in the village Pasărea.

References

Rivers of Romania
Rivers of Ilfov County